TTN may refer to:

 Tamil Television Network, a former Tamil language satellite channel
 TV Today Network, an English-Hindi news television network
 The Temple News, the student-run newspaper at Temple University
 The Things Network in low-power wide-area network, see Internet of things
 TinyaToxiN, a highly irritant analog of resiniferatoxin and capsaicin
 Totton railway station, station code
 Toxic thyroid nodule
 Transient tachypnea of the newborn
 Symbol for the gene that encodes the protein Titin
 Trenton–Mercer Airport
 TTN (gene), largest natural molecule

See also 
 ttn, an Australian news program